Harman v. Forssenius, 380 U.S. 528 (1965), was a United States Supreme Court case in which the Court ruled that Virginia's partial elimination of the poll tax violated the Twenty-fourth Amendment to the United States Constitution.

Virginia attempted to avoid the effect of the 24th Amendment by creating an "escape clause" to the poll tax. In lieu of paying the poll tax, a prospective voter could apply for a certificate establishing a place of residence in Virginia. The application had to be made six months prior to an election, a measure expected to decrease the number of eligible voters.

In the 1965 Supreme Court decision of Harman v. Forssenius, the Court unanimously found such measures unconstitutional and declared that, for federal elections, "the poll tax is abolished absolutely as a prerequisite to voting, and no equivalent or milder substitute may be imposed."

References

External links
 
 

United States Supreme Court cases
United States Supreme Court cases of the Warren Court
United States Twenty-fourth Amendment case law
1965 in United States case law
Civil rights movement case law